The Philippine Declaration of Independence was proclaimed by Filipino revolutionary forces general Emilio Aguinaldo on June 12, 1898, in Cavite el Viejo (present-day Kawit, Cavite), Philippines. It asserted the sovereignty and independence of the Philippine Islands from the colonial rule of Spain.

History

In 1896, the Philippine Revolution began. In December 1897, the Spanish government and the revolutionaries signed a truce, the Pact of Biak-na-Bato, requiring that the Spanish pay the revolutionaries $MXN800,000  and that Aguinaldo and other leaders go into exile in Hong Kong. In April 1898, at the outbreak of the Spanish–American War, Commodore George Dewey aboard the USS Olympia sailed into Manila Bay leading the Asiatic Squadron of the U.S. Navy.  On May 1, 1898, the United States defeated the Spanish in the Battle of Manila Bay. Emilio Aguinaldo decided to return to the Philippines to help American forces defeat the Spaniards. The U.S. Navy agreed to transport him back aboard the USS McCulloch, and on May 19, he arrived in Cavite.

The Proclamation on June 12
The event saw the unfurling of the flag of the Philippines, made in Hong Kong by Marcela Agoncillo, Lorenza Agoncillo, and Delfina Herboza, and the performance of the Marcha Filipina Magdalo, as the national anthem, now known as Lupang Hinirang, which was composed by Julián Felipe and played by the San Francisco de Malabon marching band.

The Act of the Declaration of Independence was prepared, written, and read by Ambrosio Rianzares Bautista in Spanish. The Declaration was signed by 98 people, among them a United States Army officer who witnessed the proclamation. The final paragraph states that there was a "stranger" (stranger in English translation—extranjero in the original Spanish, meaning foreigner) who attended the proceedings, Mr. L. M. Johnson, described as "a citizen of the U.S.A., a Colonel of Artillery". Despite his prior military experience, Johnson had no official role in the Philippines.

Ratification
The proclamation of Philippine independence was, however, promulgated on August 1, when many towns had already been organized under the rules laid down by the Dictatorial Government of General Aguinaldo. 190 municipal presidents of different towns from 16 provinces—Manila, Cavite, Laguna, Batangas, Bulacan, Bataan, Infanta, Morong, Tayabas, Pampanga, Pangasinan, Mindoro, Nueva Ecija, Tarlac, La Union, and Zambales—ratified the Proclamation of Independence in Bacoor, Cavite.

Later at Malolos, Bulacan, the Malolos Congress modified the declaration upon the insistence of Apolinario Mabini who objected to that the original proclamation essentially placed the Philippines under the protection of the United States.

Struggle for independence
The declaration was never recognized by either the United States or Spain.  Later in 1898, Spain ceded the Philippines to the United States in the 1898 Treaty of Paris that ended the Spanish–American War.

The Philippine Revolutionary Government did not recognise the treaty or American sovereignty, and subsequently fought and lost a conflict with the United States originally referred to by the Americans as the "Philippine Insurrection" but now generally and officially called the Philippine–American War, which ended when Emilio Aguinaldo was captured by U.S. forces, and issued a statement acknowledging and accepting the sovereignty of the United States over the Philippines. This was then followed on July 2, 1902, by U.S. Secretary of War Elihu Root telegraphing that the insurrection the United States had come to an end and that provincial civil governments had been established everywhere except those areas inhabited by Moro tribes. Pockets of resistance continued for several years.

Following the end of World War II, the United States granted independence to the Philippines on July 4, 1946, via the Treaty of Manila. July 4 was observed in the Philippines as Independence Day until August 4, 1964, when, upon the advice of historians and the urging of nationalists, President Diosdado Macapagal signed into law Republic Act No. 4166 designating June 12 as the country's Independence Day. June 12 had previously been observed as Flag Day and many government buildings are urged to display the Philippine Flag in their offices.

Current location of the Declaration
The Declaration is currently housed in the National Library of the Philippines. It is not on public display but it can be viewed with permission like any other document held by the National Library.

During the Philippine–American War, the American government captured and sent to the United States about 400,000 historical documents. In 1958, the documents were given to the Philippine government along with two sets of microfilm of the entire collection, with the U.S. Federal Government keeping one set.

Sometime in the 1980s or 1990s, the Declaration was stolen from the National Library. As part of a larger investigation into the widespread theft of historical documents and a subsequent public appeal for the return of stolen documents, the Declaration was returned to the National Library in 1994 by historian and University of the Philippines professor Milagros Guerrero, who mediated the return of the documents.

The text of the "Act of the Proclamation of Independence of the Filipino People"

The Act of the Proclamation of Independence of the Filipino People is part of a long line of declarations of independence including the United States Declaration of Independence. It includes a list of grievances against the Spanish government stretching back to Ferdinand Magellan's arrival in 1521 and confers upon "our famous Dictator Don Emilio Aguinaldo all the powers necessary to enable him to discharge the duties of Government, including the prerogatives of granting pardon and amnesty."

See also
History of the Philippines
Philippine Independence Day Parade
Republic Day (Philippines)

Notes

References
History of the Filipino People. Teodoro A. Agoncillo
National Library of the Philippines
 Philippine History Group of Los Angeles

External links
Acta de la proclamación de la independencia del pueblo Filipino (Spanish) by Corpus Juris online Philippine law library
Declaration of Independence (English translation) by Corpus Juris online Philippine law library

Declarations of independence
Public holidays in the Philippines
Philippine–American War
Philippine nationalism
Philippine Revolution
Separatism in Spain
1898 in international relations
June 1898 events
1898 documents